The Lüders affair was a legal and diplomatic embarrassment to the Haitian government in 1897.

On September 21, 1897, Haitian police were looking for one Dorléus Présumé, who was accused of theft. They found him washing a coach in front of the "Écuries Centrales" (Central Stables) of Port-au-Prince, whose proprietor was Emile Lüders. Présumé resisted arrest, and Lüders, who had heard the noise, came to his defence.

On September 21, 1897, both Présumé and Lüders were sentenced by the Police Tribunal to one month's imprisonment for assault and battery. They appealed to the Correctional Tribunal, but this time they were also charged with using force to resist arrest. The original sentence was annulled and on October 14 they were sentenced to one year's imprisonment.

Lüders had previously been sentenced to six days imprisonment in 1894 for battery on a soldier. Witnesses against Lüders included British, French, and German witnesses. Nonetheless, on October 17 the German Chargé d'affaires, Count Schwerin, demanded the immediate release of Lüders (who had been born in Haiti but had a German father), as well as the removal of the judges and dismissal of the police officers involved in the case. Responding to intervention by the American representative, W.F. Powell, President Sam pardoned Lüders, who left the country on October 22.

The President was required to raise a white flag on the presidential palace in token of surrender.

The Haitian government yielded, to the distress of its people, who had been prepared to defend their national honor. They were horrified to see the white flag, despite the protestations of the French ambassador, Théodore Meyer, that it was merely a parliamentary standard.

Solon Ménos, Foreign Minister of Haiti at the time, subsequently fought a duel with a member of Lüders' family and was the subject of an action for defamation by two German officials requiring him to append a statement to the end of his book on the Lüders affair.

The Lüders affair was extremely embarrassing for president Sam, and undermined his authority in Haiti, leading to his resignation in 1902.

See also
Batsch affair

References

19th century in Haiti
1897 in Germany
Foreign relations of the German Empire
1897 in international relations
1897 in Haiti
Political scandals in Haiti
Ultimata
Germany–Haiti relations